Andrej Martin and Igor Zelenay are the defending champions, but Martin did not return to defend his title. Zelenay plays alongside Mateusz Kowalczyk, they lost already in the first round to Guido Andreozzi and Nicolás Jarry.

Facundo Bagnis and Guido Pella won the tournament, defeating Italians Salvatore Caruso and Federico Gaio in the final.

Seeds

  Guillermo Durán /  Roberto Maytín (first round)
  Martin Emmrich /  Andreas Siljeström (first round)
  Mateusz Kowalczyk /  Igor Zelenay (first round)
  Facundo Bagnis /  Guido Pella (champions)

Draw

Draw

External Links
 Main Draw

Internazionali di Tennis Citta di Vicenza - Doubles
2015 Doubles